Kevin Larsson (born 15 September 2001) is a Finnish professional footballer who plays as a forward.

References

2001 births
Living people
Finnish footballers
Käpylän Pallo players
HIFK Fotboll players
AC Oulu players
Kakkonen players
Veikkausliiga players
Association football forwards